Maravan is a 1993 Indian Tamil-language action drama film directed by Manoj Kumar. The film stars Prabhu and Khushbu, with Vijayakumar, Sumithra, Napoleon, R. P. Viswam, Chandrasekhar, Thyagu, Vadivelu, Vennira Aadai Moorthy and Dakshayini playing supporting roles. It was released on 15 August 1993.

Plot
Sethupathi lived in the city with his family consisting of his father Manickam, his mother Meenakshi  and his sister Lakshmi. Manickam, Sethupathi's father, is an honest police officer and wanted his son to become a police officer like him. Sethupathi took the IPS exam and successfully passed it. Sethupathi was subsequently transferred to the remote village called Solaiyoor.

When he arrives in the village, Sethupathi is in a state of shock. The village is under the control of the village president Rajadurai (R. P. Viswam) and his son Shankarapandiyan, a corrupt politician. With the local rowdies, they spread terror among the villagers.

Sethupathi first changes the bad habits of the police officers, Thyagu and Vadivelu. In the meantime, Sethupathi and the village belle Thangathai fall in love with each other. One day, Sethupathi beats up and strips Rajadurai in front of villagers for cheating them, and he puts him in jail. Shankarapandi makes his father release him the next hour. The next day, Shankarapandi, Rajadurai and his henchmen take revenge by stripping the police officers and beating them. What transpires later forms the crux of the story.

Cast

Prabhu as Police Inspector Sethupathi
Khushbu as Thangathai
Vijayakumar as SP Manickam
Sumithra as Meenakshi
Napoleon as Shankarapandiyan
R. P. Viswam as Rajadurai
Chandrasekhar as Sekhar
Thyagu as Police Officer
Vadivelu as Constable Velu
Vennira Aadai Moorthy as Iyer
Dakshayini as Lakshmi
Oru Viral Krishna Rao
Sethu Vinayagam as DSP
Thalapathy Dinesh as Muthukalai
Boopathi Raja
Bhavani
Sharmili as Sinthamani
Mohana Priya
LIC Narasimhan
Pasi Narayanan as Vellaisamy
Karuppu Subbiah
Joker Thulasi
Thideer Kannaiah
Singamuthu
Gundu Kalyanam

Soundtrack

The music was composed by Deva, with lyrics written by Vaali.

Reception
The Indian Express wrote "Since the story has nothing new to offer, writer-director Manoj Kumar has tried to bring freshness in his treatment". K. Vijiyan of New Straits Times wrote that the film reminded him of Walter Vetrivel.

References

1993 films
1990s Tamil-language films
Films scored by Deva (composer)
Indian action drama films
1993 action drama films
Fictional portrayals of the Tamil Nadu Police
1993 drama films